Yuriy Chmyr (born 7 April 1972, Makiivka) is a Ukrainian politician.

External links 
Yuriy Chmyr at the Official Ukraine Today portal

1972 births
Living people
People from Makiivka
Party of Regions politicians
Governors of Sumy Oblast
Fifth convocation members of the Verkhovna Rada
Sixth convocation members of the Verkhovna Rada
Donetsk National Technical University alumni